Ramón Blanco may refer to:

 Ramón Blanco (alpine skier) (born 1926), Spanish Olympic skier
 Ramón Blanco y Erenas (1833–1906), Spanish soldier
 Ramón Blanco (footballer) (1952–2013), Spanish professional footballer